The Almaș is a right tributary of the river Cracău in Romania. It flows into the Cracău near Verșești.

References

Rivers of Romania
Rivers of Neamț County